The Wesel Railway Bridge was a bridge on the Haltern–Venlo railway, built as part of the Hamburg–Venlo railway by the Cologne-Minden Railway Company, and opened on 1 March 1874.

World War II

Destruction and capture
From 16 to 19 February 1945 the city of Wesel, Germany, was heavily bombed in Allied air raids, and more than 95 percent destroyed. 

On 10 March 1945 the Rhine and Lippe bridges, among others, were blown up by the Wehrmacht in compliance with Hitler's scorched earth policy that became known as the Nero Decree. 

Operation Plunder, tasked with establishing Rhine-crossings at Rees in the north, Xanten in the center, and Wesel in the south, started on 23 March, with four thousand Allied guns firing for four hours during the opening bombardment. The town of Wesel was subsequently taken quickly during the night with only 36 casualties. Field-Marshal Montgomery said of the bombing: "The bombing of Wesel was a masterpiece, and was a decisive factor in making possible our entry into the town before midnight."

Bridge reconstruction
A large force under Col. James B. Cress was organized for the reconstruction of the bridge, which included the 355th Engineer General Services Regiment commanded by Col. Thomas A. Adcock, elements of the 341st and 1317th Engineer General Services Regiments, with support from the 371st Engineer Construction Battalion, 1056th Port Construction and Repair Group, a dump truck company and an engineer maintenance company.

 
The Ninth and British 2nd were pushing east at a fast pace, so the engineering companies began working 12-hour shifts of 10 days on, 2 off, on the Rhine River Bridge project.

 
Airplanes provided protection along with anti-aircraft gun emplacements and lights on the ground. The Germans were unable to pinpoint the location of the bridge construction project.

On 4 April 1945 the pilings were braced and capped. The  towers were completed. Steel spans, ties, and track were lowered into place.

Completion

On 8 April the Rhine River Bridge at Wesel was completed. It was tested by running a train across it that night, and the bridge passed. The following morning, 50 car supply trains began crossing the bridge, keeping to a  speed limit and traveling one at a time to avoid unnecessary vibration. The Wesel Bridge was the first fixed bridge built by any army engineer to span the Rhine since the days of Caesar, according to military references, and was the first fixed bridge to span the Rhine River with highway bridges included. The "Victory Bridge" constructed by the 332nd Engineer G. S. Regiment wasn't completed until a month later, on 8 May 1945. The railroad bridge at Wesel was named the Robert A. Gouldin Bridge in honor of Major Gouldin of the 355th Engineer G.S. Regiment who lost his life during the construction of the bridge.

Between 8 and 10 April 1945, the 3rd platoon improved the western approach to the bridge, to speed the huge volume of heavy railroad traffic using the single track approach. Other units were tasked with clearing minefields for the landing of aircraft and laying of gas pipelines. One detail was erecting a prefabricated water tower and tank for the Railroad at Büderich Station.

See also
List of bridges over the Rhine

References
371st Engineer Construction Battalion WWII – Third Platoon – Company A Hist.- pp. 4–8
Royal Air Force – Squadron 57
 Fortified Wesel History

1945 in Germany
Railway bridges in Germany
Bridges over the Rhine
Former railway bridges in Germany
Bridges in North Rhine-Westphalia
Wesel